Kéniéba Airport  is an airport serving Kéniéba, a city in the Kéniéba, a city and commune of the Kéniéba Cercle in the Kayes Region of Mali.

References

Airports in Mali